WKAD (93.7 FM) is a radio station broadcasting a sports format. Licensed to Harrietta, Michigan, and serving the Cadillac market, it first began broadcasting in 2003.  WKAD features programming from Fox Sports Radio. WKAD carries the Detroit Tigers, Detroit Red Wings, Michigan Wolverines Football and Basketball, and Cadillac Viking Sports.

History
On January 2, 2012 WKAD changed formats from oldies to sports, branded as "The Ticket".

Former logo

Sources

Michiguide.com - WKAD History

External links

WKAD The Ticket 93.7 Facebook

KAD
Sports radio stations in the United States
Radio stations established in 2003
Fox Sports Radio stations